This is a list of Stanford Cardinal football players in the NFL Draft.

Key

Selections

References

Stanford

Stanford Cardinal NFL Draft
Cardinal NFL